Koli Tenguella  (or Koli Tenguella Bâ/Bah or Koli Tengella Jaaje Baa alias Koli Pullo) (1512–1537) was a Fulani warrior. In the sixteenth century, after nine attempts, he conquered Futa Toro, a kingdom located in the northeast of the current Senegal and founded the new dynasty Fulani Denianke and the latter Empire of Great Fulo. He is the ancestor of the royal and noble dynasty Déniyankobés, the Bâ genealogy to which also belong to the Koli clans Teghéla, Rella, Dianga, Soulé, diye, Waranka, but also those of Sanghé Lobaly, Waly and Sinthiane Padalal.

1512 births
1537 deaths
Fula people
Senegalese monarchs